Giannakopoulos is a Greek patronymic surname, meaning "son of Giannakis". The female version of the name is Giannakopoulou (Γιαννακοπούλου). Notable examples include:

Christos Giannakopoulos, playwright and lyricist
Pavlos Giannakopoulos (1929-2018), Greek businessman
Stelios Giannakopoulos (born 1974), Greek footballer
Thanassis Giannakopoulos (born c.1930-2019), Greek businessman, chairman of Panathinaikos BC
Konstatinos Giannakopoulos, Greek actor
Dora Giannakopoulou, Greek singer and author

Greek-language surnames
Patronymic surnames